Leucopteryx is a genus of moths in the family Saturniidae first described by Packard in 1901.

Species
Leucopteryx ansorgei (Rothschild, 1897)
Leucopteryx mollis (Butler, 1889)

References

Saturniinae